Kenya–Mexico relations are the diplomatic relations between the Republic of Kenya and the United Mexican States. Both nations are members of the Group of 15, Group of 24 and the United Nations.

History 
Kenya and Mexico established diplomatic relations on 15 March 1977, fourteen years after Kenya gained independence from the United Kingdom. In March 1981, Mexico opened an embassy in Nairobi. Since the establishment of diplomatic relations, both nations have increased their involvements in mutual scientific, educational and cultural exchanges cooperation. 

In 2010, Mexico hosted the United Nations Climate Change Conference in Cancún. Among the invitees was Prime Minister Raila Odinga. During the conference, Mexican President Felipe Calderón and Prime Minister Odinga met and during their reunion both leaders discussed increasing high level discussions between leaders of both nations and reaching agreements on education, environment, aeronautic cooperation, health and extradition. In 2011 and again in 2014; Kenyan parliamentary delegations visited Mexico to discuss issues on national security, combating organized crime, refugees and financial cooperation.

In 2014, Mexico Secretary for the Environment, Juan José Guerra Abud, paid a visit to Nairobi to attend the first universal assembly meeting for the United Nations Environment Programme. In May 2018, Ambassador Tom Amolo, Political and Diplomatic Secretary in the Ministry of Foreign Affairs & International Trade of Kenya, paid a visit to Mexico to attend the second meeting between both nations on common interests and to strengthen political and economic cooperation.

High-level visits
High-level visits from Kenya to Mexico
 Prime Minister Raila Odinga (2010)
 Political and Diplomatic Secretary Tom Amolo (2018)

High-level visits from Mexico to Kenya
 Secretary of the Environment Juan José Guerra Abud (2014)
 Director General for Africa and the Middle East Jorge Álvarez Fuentes (2018)
 Undersecretary for Multilateral Affairs and Human Rights Martha Delgado (2019)
 Undersecretary for Human Rights and Migration Alejandro Encinas Rodríguez (2019)

Bilateral relations
Both nations have signed several bilateral agreements such as an Agreement to Establish Consultations on Mutual Interests (2007); Agreement of Cooperation on the Protection and Conservation of Species and the Environment (2007); Agreement on the Cooperation in Education for Diplomacy and International Relations (2008); Agreement on Cooperation in Health (2010) and an Agreement on Cooperation for the Administration of Independent Election Commissions (2011).

Kenyan migration to Mexico

Kenyans are a recent immigrant group in Mexico and are made up primarily of athletes and their families. These individuals have arrived to train at high altitudes for endurance running. The largest Kenyan community is found in Toluca which has an elevation of 2,667m and is in proximity to the 4,680m Nevado de Toluca. The state of Zacatecas is also a destination due to the elevation and similarity to the geography of Kenya. Another factor that makes Mexico appealing to athletes is its location for easy access to marathons in North and South America. These resident Kenyans dominate national marathons. Many of these runners save winnings to send to their families in Kenya.

A small group of Kenyans with Mexican citizenship are notably professionals or students. Such notable individuals include runner Hillary Kipchirchir Kimaiyo, actor Arap Bethke, actress Lupita Nyong'o and runner Risper Biyaki Gesabwa.

Trade relations 
In 2018, two-way trade between both nations amounted to US$22 million.  Kenya's main exports to Mexico include: vegetable oil, cotton fibers, tea and leather. Mexico's main exports to Kenya include: maize, probing and drilling machinery, tractors, beer and tequila. Mexican multinational companies such as Gruma and Grupo Rotoplas operate in Kenya.

Resident diplomatic missions 
 Kenya is accredited to Mexico from its embassy in Washington, D.C., United States.
 Mexico has an embassy in Nairobi.

References 

Mexico
Bilateral relations of Mexico